C/1980 E1 is a non-periodic comet discovered by Edward L. G. Bowell on 11 February 1980 and which came closest to the Sun (perihelion) in March 1982. It is leaving the Solar System on a hyperbolic trajectory due to a close approach to Jupiter. In the 42 years since its discovery only two objects with higher eccentricities have been identified, 1I/ʻOumuamua (1.2) and 2I/Borisov (3.35).

Overview

As the comet was approaching on 9 December 1980, it passed within 0.228 AU of Jupiter, which accelerated the comet briefly giving an (epoch 1981-Jan-09) eccentricity of 1.066. Since the epoch of 1977-Mar-04, C/1980 E1 has had a barycentric eccentricity greater than 1, keeping it on a hyperbolic trajectory that will eject it from the Solar System. Objects in hyperbolic orbits have a negative semimajor axis, giving them a positive orbital energy. After leaving the Solar System, C/1980 E1 will have an interstellar velocity  of 3.77 km/s. The Minor Planet Center does not directly list a semimajor axis for this comet.

The escape velocity from the Sun at Neptune's orbit is 7.7 km/s. By June 1995, the comet was passing Neptune's orbit at 30.1 AU from the Sun continuing its ejection trajectory at 8.6 km/s. Since February 2008, the comet has been more than 50 AU from the Sun.

Emission of OH (hydroxide) was observed pre-perihelion while the comet was nearly 5 AU from the Sun. CN (cyanide) was not detected until the comet was near perihelion. The comet nucleus was estimated to have a radius of several kilometers. The surface crust was probably a few meters thick.

See also
List of Solar System objects by greatest aphelion
List of hyperbolic comets
List of non-periodic comets
List of periodic comets
1I/ʻOumuamua

Notes

References

External links 
 

Non-periodic comets
C/1980 E1
19800211
Discoveries by Edward L. G. Bowell